Paul van Loon (born 17 April 1955) is a Dutch writer of children's literature. A musical and a movie have also been made of both. The series  also became one of his best known works after the appearance of a television series and of an amusement park show in Efteling.

Van Loon has been working as a writer for over thirty years and has written more than a hundred books. Apart from the Netherlands and Belgium, his books have also been published in other countries, including Germany, France, Italy, Denmark, Estonia, Latvia, Sweden, Spain, Japan, and England.

Biography 
In his youth, Van Loon was already interested in fantasy horror stories. He read the books of Tolkien, Bram Stoker, and H. P. Lovecraft, as well as stories about local sagas and legends such as Het Limburgs Sagenboek. He had no intention of becoming a writer, but after high school, he went on to study as an illustrator at the Art Academy of Den Bosch. Van Loon did not complete his studies there. He did, however, regularly create stories for himself for the drawings he made during his studies. After he sent one of these stories to the Brabants Nieuwsblad in 1977, he was asked to write more stories, as his first proved popular with readers. Van Loon accepted this request and wrote more stories. Other magazines also showed interest in his work, such as Donald Duck Weekblad, Okki, Taptoe and, Ezelsoor.

Van Loon's first book was published in 1983. Initially, he illustrated his books himself, but as he focused more and more on writing, other illustrators took over this work. In 1997 he wrote the  LYC-DROP, which was later published under the title Wolven in de stad. The same year he wrote , which remains a children's favorite in the Netherlands after over 25 years.

In addition to being a writer, Van Loon is also a guitarist. He is married and has a daughter. He lives in Drunen.

Selected bibliography
 1991 - De griezelbus 1 (Elzenga / 24th edition Leopold 2002)
 1997 -  (Leopold), was the basis for the eponymous performance by Theater Terra
 2007 - Weerwolfgeheimen (Leopold)
 2009 - Een weerwolf in de Leeuwenkuil
 2011 -  (Leopold) - (commissioned by De Efteling)
 2011 - SuperDolfje (Leopold)
 2012 - Weerwolf(n)achtbaan (Leopold) - in collaboration with De Efteling 
 2016 - De Sprookjessprokkelaar (Leopold) - in collaboration with Princess Laurentien (commissioned by De Efteling)
 2017 -  (Leopold) - (commissioned by De Efteling)

Adaptations
 2005 - Gruesome School Trip (film)
 2010 -  (film)
 2011 -  (film)
 2011 -  (TV series)
 2013 -  (TV series)
 2016 - Meester Kikker (film)
 2016 - Het verhaal van De Sprookjessprokkelaar

References

External links 
 Paul van Loon (in Dutch), Digital Library for Dutch Literature

1955 births
Living people
Dutch children's writers
People from Geleen